Mitch Clark may refer to

Mitch Clark (footballer, born 1999), Welsh footballer.
Mitch Clark (Australian footballer) (born 1987), retired Australian rules football player
Mitch Clark (rugby league), New Zealand rugby league footballer for Castleford Tigers

See also
Mitch Clarke, former UFC martial artist and wrestler
Mitch Clarke (basketball), Australian basketball player